Hasanabad-e Olya (also Romanized as Ḩasanābād-e ‘Olyā; also known as Ḩasanābād) is a village in Dashtab Rural District, in the Central District of Baft County, Kerman Province, Iran. At the 2006 census, its population was 55, in 10 families.

References 

Populated places in Baft County